Zach Klein (born ) is an American entrepreneur and investor, and former CEO of Dwell. He is best known for co-founding and designing Vimeo. He also co-founded DIY.org, and created the Cabin Porn phenomenon, which was initially an online project "created by a group of friends to inspire their own homebuilding" but grew into a global phenomenon, attracting thousands of submissions from fellow cabin builders.

Education 
Klein spent his earliest years in Western New York and later lived in Fort Wayne, Indiana, where he attended Bishop Luers High School. He is a graduate of Wake Forest University where he was a studio art major.

Career 
He was a partner at Connected Ventures, which founded and operated CollegeHumor. He was a faculty member at the School of Visual Arts, where he taught in the MFA program in Interaction Design.

In February 2020, Klein was appointed as CEO of the design and technology brand Dwell.

Selected publications 
In 2015, Klein published the Cabin Porn photo-book followed by Cabin Porn: Inside in 2020.

References

External links 
 

American computer businesspeople
1982 births
Wake Forest University alumni
Living people
Vimeo
CollegeHumor people
People from Fort Wayne, Indiana